Ashley is a city in and the county seat of McIntosh County, North Dakota, United States. The population was 613 at the 2020 census.

History
Ashley was laid out in 1888 when the Minneapolis, St. Paul and Sault Ste. Marie Railroad was extended to that point. The city was named for Ashley E. Morrow, a railroad man. A post office has been in operation at Ashley since 1888. The McIntosh County Courthouse was built in 1919.

Geography
Ashley is located at  (46.034894, -99.373714).

Climate
Winters are frigid and dry with moderate snowfall, while summers are wetter and very warm with pleasant mornings.

Demographics

2010 census
As of the census of 2010, there were 749 people, 391 households, and 201 families residing in the city. The racial makeup of the city was 97.3% White, 0.1% African American, 0.1% Native American, 0.7% Asian, and 1.7% from two or more races. Hispanic or Latino of any race were 0.4% of the population.

There were 391 households, of which 13.0% had children under the age of 18 living with them, 44.8% were married couples living together, 4.1% had a female householder with no husband present, 2.6% had a male householder with no wife present, and 48.6% were non-families. 45.5% of all households were made up of individuals, and 31% had someone living alone who was 65 years of age or older. The average household size was 1.80 and the average family size was 2.46.

The median age in the city was 64.3 years. 12.3% of residents were under the age of 18; 3% were between the ages of 18 and 24; 14% were from 25 to 44; 22% were from 45 to 64; and 48.6% were 65 years of age or older. The gender makeup of the city was 45.1% male and 54.9% female.

2000 census

As of the census of 2000, there were 882 people, 436 households, and 258 families residing in the city. The population density was 1,404.9 people per square mile (540.5/km). There were 528 housing units at an average density of 841.0 per square mile (323.6/km). The racial makeup of the city was 98.41% White, 0.34% Native American, 0.91% Asian, and 0.34% from two or more races. Hispanic or Latino of any race were 0.91% of the population.

The top 6 ancestry groups in the city are German (66.9%), Russian (15.1%), Norwegian (7.1%), United States (3.3%), English (2.3%), French (1.9%).

There were 436 households, out of which 12.6% had children under the age of 18 living with them, 54.1% were married couples living together, 3.2% had a female householder with no husband present, and 40.8% were non-families. 39.4% of all households were made up of individuals, and 25.7% had someone living alone who was 65 years of age or older. The average household size was 1.90 and the average family size was 2.49.

In the city, the population was spread out, with 12.0% under the age of 18, 4.2% from 18 to 24, 14.4% from 25 to 44, 21.2% from 45 to 64, and 48.2% who were 65 years of age or older. The median age was 64 years. For every 100 females, there were 82.2 males. For every 100 females age 18 and over, there were 83.0 males.

The median income for a household in the city was $18,015, and the median income for a family was $28,500. Males had a median income of $17,292 versus $14,783 for females. The per capita income for the city was $13,001. About 9.3% of families and 18.9% of the population were below the poverty line, including 9.3% of those under age 18 and 27.4% of those age 65 or over.

Notable people
 David Berman, Las Vegas gambling pioneer and Jewish mob boss, grew up in Ashley
 Frederick Herzog, Duke University theologian (1960-1995), was born in and grew up in an Ashley parsonage
 Bryan Klipfel, superintendent of the North Dakota Highway Patrol (2003–2007)

References

External links

 City of Ashley official website

Cities in North Dakota
German-Russian culture in North Dakota
Cities in McIntosh County, North Dakota
County seats in North Dakota
Populated places established in 1887
1887 establishments in Dakota Territory